Wanging'ombe District is one of the six districts of the Njombe Region of Tanzania, East Africa. The administrative seat is in Igwachanya.

History
Wanging'ombe District was formally established when it was gazetted in March 2012.  It was created out of part of the old Njombe District that had been in Iringa Region.

Wards
As of 2012, Wanging'ombe District was administratively divided into sixteen wards:

 Igima
 Igosi
 Ilembula
 Imalinyi
 Kidugala
 Kijombe
 Kipengele
 Luduga
 Makoga
 Mdandu
 Saja
 Uhambule
 Ulembwe
 Usuka
 Wangama
 Wanging'ombe

LYADEBWE

Notes

Districts of Njombe Region
States and territories established in 2012